Maramec is a town in Pawnee County, Oklahoma, United States. The population was 91 at the 2010 census, a decline of 12.5 percent from the figure 104 recorded in 2000.

Geography
Maramec is located at  (36.242521, -96.681001).

Demographics

As of the census of 2000, there were 104 people, 46 households, and 28 families residing in the town. There were 64 housing units at an average density of 263.3 per square mile (103.0/km2). The racial makeup of the town was 96.15% White, 2.88% Native American and 0.96% Asian. Hispanic or Latino of any race were 4.81% of the population.

There were 46 households, out of which 26.1% had children under the age of 18 living with them, 52.2% were married couples living together, 8.7% had a female householder with no husband present, and 37.0% were non-families. 32.6% of all households were made up of individuals, and 19.6% had someone living alone who was 65 years of age or older. The average household size was 2.26 and the average family size was 2.86.

In the town, the population was spread out, with 22.1% under the age of 18, 8.7% from 18 to 24, 28.8% from 25 to 44, 23.1% from 45 to 64, and 17.3% who were 65 years of age or older. The median age was 40 years. For every 100 females, there were 100.0 males. For every 100 females age 18 and over, there were 92.9 males.

The median income for a household in the town was $25,357, and the median income for a family was $24,750. Males had a median income of $19,167 versus $12,083 for females. The per capita income for the town was $12,578. There were no families and 1.8% of the population living below the poverty line, including no under eighteens and none of those over 64.

Historic Site

The First State Bank of Maramec is located at the junction of 2nd Ave. and Hickory St.

References

Towns in Pawnee County, Oklahoma
Towns in Oklahoma